Neolemonniera clitandrifolia is a species of plant in the family Sapotaceae. It is found in Ghana, Liberia, Nigeria, and Sierra Leone. It is threatened by habitat loss.

References

clitandrifolia
Endangered plants
Taxa named by Auguste Chevalier
Taxonomy articles created by Polbot